The Northwest Branch Saint John River (French: Décharge du Lac Frontière) is a  river primarily in Aroostook County, Maine, USA. Its origin is Frontier Lake (Quebec-Maine) in Quebec, Canada. After crossing the Canada–United States border, the Northwest Branch runs south close to the border until it picks up its tributary, the Daaquam River, which also flows out of Canada. 
The Northwest Branch then runs generally eastward to its confluence with the Southwest Branch to form the Saint John River.

Has current flowing in:
 Montmagny Regional County Municipality (RCM): municipality of Lac-Frontière, Quebec;
 Aroostook County: (township T11 R17 WELS), in the state of Maine;
 Somerset County, Maine: (township T10 R17 WELS), in the state of Maine.

On the US side, a road from Frontier Lake (Quebec-Maine) moves Eastward through the mountains. In addition, a road runs on the North bank on a river segment, downstream of the confluence of the Daaquam River and serves the township T11 R17 WELS in the North Maine Woods.

Geography 
Consequently, the "Northwest Branch Saint John River" officially rises at the US border and not at the mouth of Frontière Lake in the municipality of Lac-Frontière, Quebec.

This source is located at  Southeast of Lac Etchemin and  Northeast of the Canada-US border.

  to the South in the municipality of Lac-Frontière, Quebec, to the Canada-US border;

  to the Southeast, up to the limit of the township T12 R17 WELS;
  to the South and the Southwest, up to the confluence of the Otter River (Northwest Branch Saint John River) (from the West), located in the township T11 R17 WELS;
  to the Southeast, up to the confluence of the Daaquam River (from West);

  Eastward up to Bean Creek (from the North);
  to Southeast, up to Oak Brook (from the North);
  Southward forming a curve to the East, up to the boundary between Bellechasse Township and the Township of St. John West, to the limit of Somerset County, Maine;
  to Southeast in the township of T10 R17 WELS Somerset County, Maine, up to the confluence of the river

"Northwest Branch Saint John River" flows on the Southwest bank of the Saint John River. This confluence is common with that of the Southwest Branch Saint John River (coming from South).

From the confluence of the Northwest Branch Saint-Jean River, the Saint John River flows Eastward and Northeast through Maine, then East and Southeast through New Brunswick. Finally, the current flows on the North bank of the Bay of Fundy which opens to the Southwest on the Atlantic Ocean.

See also
List of rivers of Maine
List of rivers of Quebec

References

Maine Streamflow Data from the USGS
Maine Watershed Data From Environmental Protection Agency

Montmagny Regional County Municipality
Rivers of Chaudière-Appalaches
Tributaries of the Saint John River (Bay of Fundy)
Rivers of Aroostook County, Maine
Rivers of Somerset County, Maine
North Maine Woods